Paul L. Bradford (born April 20, 1974) is a former American football cornerback. He played college football at Portland State. He was drafted by the San Diego Chargers in the fifth round (146th overall) of the 1997 NFL Draft.

Early years
Bradford attended Carlmont High School where he was an All-state honorable mention football player. He then attended College of San Mateo and lettered twice in football. He then transferred to Portland State University where he majored in physical education. In two seasons at Portland State, he recorded 80 tackles, four interceptions, and 13 pass deflections.

Professional career
Bradford was drafted in the fifth round (146th overall) by the San Diego Chargers. As a rookie, he appeared in 15 games with four starts. All four starts came at left cornerback. He recorded 23 total tackles, two interceptions (one for a touchdown), one fumble recovery (for a touchdown) and seven passes defensed. He recorded his first interception while replacing Dwayne Harper during Week 10 against the Seattle Seahawks, intercepting Warren Moon, it was also his only interception returned for a touchdown. He started in place of the injured Harper the next week, intercepting a Jeff George pass intended James Jett. On August 15, 1998, he re-signed with the Chargers. In 1998, he injured his knee and was placed on injured reserve, resulting in his missing the entire season. He was re-signed by the Chargers on April 2, 1999. He was released on September 5, 1999. On March 7, 2000, he was signed by the Minnesota Vikings. He was released on July 5, 2000.

Bradford was selected in the sixth (44th overall) in the 2001 XFL Draft by the Las Vegas Outlaws.

Personal life
Bradford is married to his wife Margarita, the couple have 2 daughters and 2 sons, and reside in East Palo Alto.

References

1974 births
Living people
American football defensive backs
Portland State Vikings football players
San Diego Chargers players
Minnesota Vikings players
Las Vegas Outlaws (XFL) players
San Mateo Bulldogs football players
Sportspeople from the San Francisco Bay Area
Players of American football from California
People from East Palo Alto, California